Charlton Wollaston (1733–1764) was an English medical doctor, physician to Guy's Hospital from 1762. He was also physician to the Queen's Household.

He was a son of Francis Wollaston (1694–1774), and entered Sidney Sussex College, Cambridge in 1748. He graduated M.B. in 1753, and M.D. in 1758. He was elected a Fellow of the Royal Society in 1756, and was Harveian Orator in 1763.

Family
Wollaston married in 1758 Phyllis Byam. Charlton Byam Wollaston (1765–1840), Assistant Judge Advocate, was their son.

Notes

1733 births
1764 deaths
Fellows of the Royal Society